Danielle Joyce is a Scottish athlete, who swims freestyle and backstroke in the S15 hearing impaired category. In 2017, she became a double gold medallist at the 23rd Deaflympics in Samsun, Turkey. She was born with moderate hearing loss which deteriorated rapidly from about the age of 12. She is now profoundly deaf in one ear and severely deaf in the other.

Early life 
Joyce was born on 14 June 1996, and grew up in Stevenston, North Ayrshire. While she was still a toddler she took up swimming at the North Ayrshire Swimming Club but experienced numerous physical problems. In September 2011 Joyce broke a bone in her foot and gave up swimming altogether. However, a number of years later at a disability sports day she was encouraged to consider deaf swimming.

She was Head Girl at Auchenharvie Academy before studying BSc Sport and Exercise at the University of Stirling.

List of records and awards 
 Double Gold medalist 50 & 100 Freestyle at 2017 Deaflympics, Samsun Turkey 
 Scottish Disability Sports & Scottish Swimming Disability swimmer of the year 2017
 Scottish Women in Sport Sportswoman of the Year 2015 (mainstream award)
 Current holder of 8 deaf world records
 Broken Deaf world records 28 times in last 3 years
 Youth Deaf sports personality 2014
 3rd in World Deaf Sports Woman of the Year 2015 
 Runner Up Deaf Sports Personality of the Year 2015/2016   
 World Deaf Backstroke Champion Texas 2015
 7 Deaflympics finals 2013
 9 Gold medals at 2016 GB Deaf Swimming Championships
 UK Deaf Sports Ambassador
 NDCS Scotland's first Sports Ambassador
 Selected as part of the Scottish Disability Sports Youth Panel
 North Ayrshire Rising Star winner
 North Ayrshire Provosts Civic Pride Sports award winner 2015
 North Ayrshire Community Sports Personality of the year 2016 
 Commonwealth baton bearer 2014
She is currently coached by Bradley Hay.

References

1996 births
Living people
Sportspeople from North Ayrshire
Alumni of the University of Stirling
Deaf swimmers
Scottish female swimmers
Scottish deaf people
People from Stevenston